Bulbine lolita is a species of flowering plant in the family Asphodelaceae, native to the Knersvlakte region of the Northern Cape province of South Africa. It is the smallest known monocot succulent, measuring  no more than 3/5ths inch (15 mm) wide by 1/4th inch (6 mm) in height. A recent discovery, it was unknown prior to 1999. It is also remarkable for its  multicolored leaves.

References

lolita
Endemic flora of South Africa
Flora of the Cape Provinces
Plants described in 2006